The Jornal Tribuna de Macau is one of three Portuguese-language newspapers in Macau. It is published seven days a week, appearing in the morning, and covers both local and international news.

José Rocha Diniz is its director. The Jornal Tribuna, or JTM, was created with the merger of the Jornal de Macau and the Tribuna de Macau, two of the region's oldest Portuguese-language newspapers, both of which emerged in the 1980s.

The JTM is affiliated with the Portuguese newspaper Diário de Notícias, and says in its mission statement that its aim is to encourage the use of Portuguese and help Macau maintain ties with Portugal and the rest of the Portuguese-speaking world.

References

External links
  

Newspapers published in Macau